The Black Forest Open Air Museum is an open-air museum located between Hausach and Gutach in the Black Forest (Germany).

The museum is centred on the Vogtsbauernhof farmhouse dating from 1612, which was built on this site. Other buildings from the Black Forest have been dismantled, transported to the museum and reassembled. The museum has attracted over 16 million visitors since its opening in 1964.

Attractions
There are six fully furnished farmhouses:
Vogtsbauernhof – built on the site, elevation 260 m, in 1612. Inside is an exhibition of typical work carried out by travelling craftsmen.
Hotzenwaldhaus – from Hotzenwald, elevation 920 m. Built in 1756. Exhibition of Black Forest textile handicraft.
Falkenhof – from the Dreisam Valley, elevation 530 m. Built in 1737. Exhibitions are on dairy and livestock farming in the Black Forest and a comparison of historical and modern light sources.
Schauinslandhaus – from Schauinsland, elevation 1,100 m. Built in 1730. Exhibition of woodworking craft.
Hippenseppenhof – from Furtwangen-Katzensteig, elevation 920 m. Built in 1599. Exhibitions on clocks and traditional costumes of the Black Forest.
Lorenzenhof – from Oberwolfach in the Kinzig valley, 350 m. Built in 1608. Exhibitions of forestry management and glassblowing and a collection of regional stone and minerals.

Other buildings include a day labourer's cottage (1819) and outbuildings including a mill (1609), a sawmill (1673), barns, stalls, a chapel (1736), a storehouse (1601–1746) and a granny house (Leibgedinghaus,1652).

Around the buildings are farm animals and a herb garden with over 130 medicinal herbs. Demonstrations of exhibitions illustrate the crafts, tools, customs, traditions, work and lifestyle of former times.

History
The museum opened in 1964, founded as the first open-air museum in Baden-Württemberg. Key events in the museum's history are:
1963 Foundation of the museum and beginning of restoration of Vogtsbauernhof farmstead 
1964 Opening of Vogtsbauernhof farmstead and its outbuildings 
1966 Opening of Hippenseppenhof farmstead and its outbuildings 
1972 Opening of Lorenzenhof farmstead 
1980 Opening of Hotzenwald farmstead 
1982 Opening of Schauinsland farmstead 
1996 Museum is transferred into an enterprise 
1999 Opening of Falkenhof farmstead 
2002 Opening of Day labourer's Cottage "Wirtstonis"
2006 Opening of the new Reception building
2010 Opening of the new Adventure playground
2014 Opening of the Gutach Freilichtmuseum railway station

Visiting
The museum is open daily from the end of March until early November. It claims to be the most visited open-air museum in Germany and one of the most visited throughout Europe, with more than 250,000 visitors a year. Since its opening, the museum has attracted over 13.5 million visitors.

Photo gallery

References

External links
 Official website of the Open Air Museum

Black Forest
Open-air museums in Germany
Farm museums in Germany
Folk museums in Germany
Rural history museums in Germany
Culture of Baden-Württemberg
Museums in Baden-Württemberg
1964 establishments in West Germany
Buildings and structures in Ortenaukreis
Tourist attractions in Baden-Württemberg